The 2021 F4 British Championship was a multi-event, Formula 4 open-wheel single seater motor racing championship held across United Kingdom. The championship featured a mix of professional motor racing teams and privately funded drivers, competing in Formula 4 cars that conformed to the technical regulations for the championship. This, the seventh season, following on from the British Formula Ford Championship, was the seventh year that the cars conformed to the FIA's Formula 4 regulations. Part of the TOCA tour, it formed part of the extensive program of support categories built up around the BTCC centrepiece.

The season commenced on 8 May at Thruxton Circuit and concluded on 24 October at Brands Hatch, utilising the Grand Prix circuit, after thirty races held at ten meetings, all in the support of the 2021 British Touring Car Championship.

From this season forward, the grid for race 2 is a full reverse grid based on the results of qualifying, instead of reversing the top half drivers from race 1.

This was the last season of the championship using the combination of Mygale M14-F4 chassis and the engines supplied by Ford.

Teams and drivers
All teams were British-registered.

Race calendar 
All races were held in the United Kingdom. All rounds supported 2021 British Touring Car Championship. The provisional calendar was announced on 20 July 2020. An amended version was unveiled on 14 January 2021 with the season opener moving to 8 May at Thruxton Circuit. Further changes were published on 15 March 2021.

Championship standings 

Points were awarded to the top ten classified finishers in races 1 and 3 and for the top eight classified finishers in race 2. During the round at Brands Hatch utilising the Indy circuit, the race awarding 15 points for the winner was run as the first one. From this round onwards, an extra point was awarded for every position a competitor gained during a reverse grid race.

Drivers' Standings

Rookie Cup

Teams Cup
Each team nominated two drivers to score points before every round. All non-nominated drivers were ignored.

Notes

References

External links 

 

F4 British Championship seasons
British
F4
British F4